The 1998–99 Ukrainian Cup  was the eighth annual season of Ukraine's football knockout competition, also known as Kubok of Ukraine.

The Cup began with a Preliminary Round .

The winners of this competition will enter as Ukraine's Cup Winner representative in the UEFA Cup for 1999—2000 season.

Competition schedule

Preliminary round 
There was a single game between two Ternopil Oblast teams on August 1, 1998.

Notes:

First Qualification Round 
The first games took place on August 25 and the second – August 29.

|}

Second Qualification Round 

|}

Third Qualification Round 

|}

Fourth Qualification Round 

|}

First round 

|}

Quarterfinals 

|}

Semifinals 

|}

First leg

Second leg

Final

The final was held at the NSC Olimpiysky on May 30, 1999, in Kyiv.

Top goalscorers

See also 
1998–99 Ukrainian Second League
1998–99 Ukrainian First League
1998–99 UEFA Cup

References

External links
 PFL official website 
 Game reports
 Competition calendar

Ukrainian Cup seasons
Cup
Ukrainian Cup